is a Japanese anime television series produced by BN Pictures. It aired on Nagoya TV and other affiliates of the TV Asahi Network from October 11, 2015 to March 27, 2016, when it was replaced by Mobile Suit Gundam Unicorn RE:0096 the week after.

Plot 
One day, sixth grade student Hibiki Kazaguruma meets a small robot named Breakin. He discovers Breakin can talk, and Breakin tells him that he was banished from the Dance World, and to return, he must collect the Dance Stones, which are scattered all around the planet. Hibiki fuses with Breakin and becomes the dancing superhero Flash Beat. Flash Beat will collect the Dance Stones, but he is not the only one who wants them...

Characters

Brave Beats

Villains

Others

Media

Anime
The anime is produced by BN Pictures and aired from October 11, 2015 to March 27, 2016 with the same production team who made the 2014 dance anime series Tribe Cool Crew. The opening theme is "pop that!!" performed by lol, and the ending theme is "Hana Hirku Toki" performed by Shion Miyawaki. This is the first of TV Asahi's anime in the 21st century to have an ending theme.

Episode list

References

External links
 

Anime with original screenplays
Bandai Namco Pictures
Music in anime and manga
Science fiction anime and manga
Sunrise (company)